Jolly Hallo is a 2001 Sri Lankan Sinhala comedy action film directed by Srilal Priyadeva and produced by Nimal Weerakkody for Nimalaweera Films. It stars Bandu Samarasinghe and Nilanthi Dias in lead roles along with Freddie Silva, Arjuna Kamalanath and Ananda Wickramage. Music composed by Mervyn Priyantha. It is the 963rd Sri Lankan film in the Sinhala cinema. The film won the Sarasaviya Award for the Most Popular Film of The Year 2001 and Bandu Samarasinghe won the Sarasaviya Award for the creative performance.

Plot

Cast
 Bandu Samarasinghe as Brando
 Nilanthi Dias as Thushara
 Freddie Silva as Brando's Father
 Ananda Wickramage as Veterinary doctor 
 Arjuna Kamalanath as Jonny
 Manel Wanaguru as Brando's mother
 Srinath Maddumage as Threewheel driver
 Teddy Vidyalankara as Kapila aka Maramus
 Eardley Wedamuni as Malan
 Hemantha Iriyagama as dog owner
 Sathish Perera as Jonny's friend

Soundtrack

References

2001 films
2000s Sinhala-language films